Transition nuclear proteins (TNPs) are proteins that are involved in the packaging of sperm nuclear DNA during spermiogenesis.  They take the place of histones associated with the sperm DNA, and are subsequently themselves replaced by protamines.

TNPs in humans include TNP1 and TNP2.

See also
 Chromatin
 Histone
 Protamine
 Sperm
 Spermatogenesis
 Spermiogenesis

References

Andrology
Reproductive system
Proteins